Barrow Hall may refer to: 
Barrow Hall, Cheshire, a grade II-listed building in Barrow, Cheshire
Barrow Hall, Lincolnshire, a grade I-listed building in Barrow-upon-Humber.
Barrow Hall, a fictional castle in the Song of Ice and Fire series.